Tierra Oscura  is a town and corregimiento in Bocas del Toro District, Bocas del Toro Province, Panama. It was created by Law 10 of March 7, 1997; this measure was complemented by Law 5 of January 19, 1998 and Law 69 of October 28, 1998. Its population as of 2000 was 1,950.

References

Populated places in Bocas del Toro Province
Corregimientos of Bocas del Toro Province